This is a list of people from Craiova, Romania.

Constantin Angelescu (1870–1948), interim Prime Minister (1933-1934)
Constantin Argetoianu (1871–1955), Prime Minister (1871-1955)
Corneliu Baba (1906–1997), painter
Doina Badea (1940–1977), singer of popular music
Gheorghe Bibescu (1804–1873), Prince of Wallachia (1843-1848)
Lola Bobesco (1921–2003), violinist
Adrian Cioroianu (1967–), historian, Foreign Minister (2007-2008)
Constantin Coandă (1857–1932), soldier, Prime Minister (1918)
George Constantinescu (1881–1965), inventor
Paul Curteanu (1983–), football player
Traian Demetrescu (1866–1896), poet
Alexandru Dobriceanu (1894–1978), general
Diana Dondoe (1982–), model
Dimitrie Gerota (1867–1939), anatomist and physician
D. Iacobescu (1893–1913), poet
Adriana Iliescu (1938–), author, briefly the oldest birth mother on record
Marius Ionescu (1984–), long-distance runner
Titu Maiorescu (1840–1917), Prime Minister (1913–1914)
Valter Mărăcineanu (1840–1877), soldier, fought in the War of Independence
Ludovic Mrazec (1867–1944), geologist, President of the Romanian Academy
Jean Negulesco (1900–1993), film director
Marcel Olteanu (1872–1943), general
Constantin Titel Petrescu (1888–1957), Social Democratic politician
Eduard Prugovečki (1937–2003), physicist and mathematician
Constantin Sănătescu (1885–1947), soldier, Prime Minister (1944)
Mihail Șerban (1930–2004), biochemist
Francisc Șirato (1877–1953), painter
Mihai Stănișoară (1962–), Defense Minister (2008-2009)
Barbu Dimitrie Știrbei (1799–1869), Prince of Wallachia (1848–1853; 1854–1856)
Nicolae Titulescu (1882–1941), Foreign Minister (1927–1928), League of Nations General Assembly President (1930–1932)
Ion Țuculescu (1910–1962), painter
Nicolae Vasilescu-Karpen (1870–1964), engineer
Varujan Vosganian (1958–), National Liberal politician

 
Craiova